Kremná is a village and municipality in Stará Ľubovňa District in the Prešov Region of northern Slovakia.

History
In historical records the village was first mentioned in 1773.

Geography
The municipality lies at an altitude of 607 metres and covers an area of 4.141 km². It has a population of about 110 people.

External links
Kremná - The Carpathian Connection
https://web.archive.org/web/20080111223415/http://www.statistics.sk/mosmis/eng/run.html 

Villages and municipalities in Stará Ľubovňa District